Leccinum duriusculum is a bolete mushroom in the genus Leccinum. Originally called Boletus duriusculus by Hungarian–Croatian mycologist Stephan Schulzer von Müggenburg in 1874, it was transferred to Leccinum by Rolf Singer in 1947.

See also
List of Leccinum species

References

Duriusculum
Fungi described in 1874
Fungi of Europe